Gershon Dua-Bogen (1892 – 1948), alias 'Admoni', was a Polish-Jewish communist leader. He was an active militant of the Communist Party of Poland (KPP) and of the Polish Workers' Party (PPR). He emigrated to the British Mandate of Palestine and became the general secretary of the Socialist Workers Party. He was expelled from the territory by the British for his political activities. During the Spanish Civil War, he served as a political commissar in the base of the International Brigades in Albacete.

Bibliography 
 Dua-Bogen, Gershon, and Mirski, Michal. אויף די שפורן פון גבורה, Oyf di shpurn fun gvure. Steven Spielberg digital Yiddish library, no. 07087. Amherst: National Yiddish Book Center, 2000. (in Yiddish)

References 

1892 births
1948 deaths
Jewish socialists
Communist Party of Poland politicians
Polish Workers' Party politicians
International Brigades personnel
Socialist Workers Party (Mandatory Palestine) politicians
Jewish anti-fascists
Polish emigrants to Mandatory Palestine